Matteo Piccardo (born 28 February 2000) is an Italian professional footballer who plays as a left back.

Club career
Born in Genoa, Piccardo was formed as a player in Genoa youth system.

After his promotion to the first team in 2020, he was sold to Serie C club Pergolettese.

International career
Piccardo was a young international for Italy. 
Convocazioni Federazione Italiana Giuoco Calcio FIGC
Italia U19	14/ago/2018		-		18 anni 
Italia U18	02/set/2017		-		17 anni 
Italia U16	22/ott/2015		-		15 anni

References

 4. https://www.pianetagenoa1893.net/tag/matteo-piccardo/
 5. https://genova.repubblica.it/cronaca/2020/12/09/news/la_favola_di_piccardo_ragazzo_di_san_fruttuoso-277596429/
 6. https://www.lanazione.it/massa-carrara/calcio/entra-il-baby-piccardo-e-manda-al-tappeto-la-carrarese-vince-2-1-la-pergolettese-1.5788474
 7. https://www.buoncalcioatutti.it/2019/06/05/genoa-primavera-piccardo-ho-dato-tutto-per-questa-maglia-la-mia-maglia-foto/

External links
 
 

2000 births
Living people
Footballers from Genoa
Italian footballers
Association football defenders
Serie C players
Genoa C.F.C. players
U.S. Pergolettese 1932 players
Italy youth international footballers